Košarkarski klub Celje, commonly referred to as KK Celje or simply Celje, is a Slovenian basketball club based in Celje. The team currently competes in the Slovenian Second League.

Honours
Slovenian Third League
 2013–14

References

External links
Official website 

Basketball teams established in 2011
Basketball teams in Slovenia
Sport in Celje
2011 establishments in Slovenia